The 551 Beirut earthquake occurred on 9 July with an estimated magnitude of about 7.5 on the moment magnitude scale and a maximum felt intensity of X (Extreme) on the Mercalli intensity scale. It triggered a devastating tsunami which affected the coastal towns of Byzantine Phoenicia, causing great destruction and sinking many ships. Overall large numbers of people were reported killed, with one estimate of 30,000 by the Anonymous pilgrim of Piacenza for Beirut alone.

Tectonic setting

Lebanon lies astride the Dead Sea Transform, which forms part of the boundary between the Arabian Plate and the African Plate. In Lebanon the fault zone forms a restraining bend associated with a right stepping offset of the fault trace. Transpressional deformation associated with this bend has formed a number of thrust faults, such as the recently identified Mount Lebanon thrust, which underlies the city and is interpreted to crop out at the seabed offshore.

Damage
There is little in the way of detailed descriptions of the damage caused by this earthquake in contemporary accounts. Sources refer to the coastal cities from Tyre to Tripoli being reduced to ruins with many thousands of casualties. The Anonymous pilgrim of Piacenza reported that 30,000 people died in Beirut alone. Reports of damage at Petra and other locations in the Jordan Valley associated with the 551 event have been re-analyzed, suggesting that a later earthquake was more likely to be responsible.

Characteristics

Earthquake
The earthquake was felt over a wide area from Alexandria in the southwest to Antioch in the north previously damaged by the earthquake of 526. The area of felt intensity of VIII or more extends from Tripoli in the north to Tyre in the south. Estimates for the magnitude vary from 7.2 on the surface wave magnitude scale to a possible 7.5 on the moment magnitude scale. The origin of the tsunami was thought to have been due to an underwater landslide triggered by an earthquake on the Dead Sea Transform itself. More recent analysis suggested that an offshore continuation of the Roum Fault mapped onshore may have been responsible. However, seabed surveys have discounted this possibility and the discovery of geologically recent fault scarps at seabed indicate that movement on the newly identified Mount Lebanon Thrust was the cause of the earthquake and the resulting tsunami. Quaternary uplift recorded by a series of marine-cut terraces between Tripoli and Beirut are consistent with continuing upward movement of the hanging wall of the proposed thrust. At a smaller scale, an uplifted vermetid bench, which indicates vertical movement of about 80 cm, is dated to the sixth century A.D. Continued uplift above this thrust since the late Miocene may explain the formation of the Mount Lebanon range.

Tsunami
The tsunami affected the whole of the coast from Tyre to Tripoli. Withdrawal of the sea by up to two miles was recorded in some contemporary accounts.

Future seismic hazard
The estimated return time for large earthquakes on the Mount Lebanon thrust is 1500–1750 years, although a shorter return time is also possible depending on the dating of the most recent sea-level highstand. This latter possibility would indicate that a repeat of this event may be long overdue.

See also
List of historical earthquakes
List of tsunamis
6th century in Lebanon

References

0551 Beirut
6th-century earthquakes
Lebanon in the Roman era
550s in the Byzantine Empire
551
Medieval tsunamis
Earthquakes in the Byzantine Empire